Jia Bagga railway station (Urdu and ) is located in Jia Bagga village, Lahore district of Punjab province in Pakistan.

See also
 List of railway stations in Pakistan
 Pakistan Railways

References

Railway stations in Lahore District
Railway stations on Karachi–Peshawar Line (ML 1)